James W. Edming (born November 22, 1945) is an American businessman and Republican politician.  He is a member of the Wisconsin State Assembly since 2015, representing the 87th Assembly district.

Biography

From Glen Flora, Wisconsin, Edming graduated from Flambeau High School in Tony, Wisconsin, in 1964.  He earned a teaching certificate from the Taylor County Teacher's College in 1967 and attended various other University of Wisconsin System institutions, but did not receive another degree.

He became an entrepreneur and, in 1972, became the owner of Edming Oil Company, a gas station and convenience store.  He went on, in 1974, to become the owner of Edming Manufacturing Co., a livestock feed and farm supply company.  In the 1980s, he founded OvenWorks Pizza, a manufacturer of frozen pizzas.

He served on the Rusk County Board of Supervisors from 1978 to 1988, and served on the Rusk County Hospital Board from 1980 to 1982, and again from 2010 to 2018.

In 2014, he entered the race for Wisconsin State Assembly in the 87th district following the announcement that six-term incumbent Mary Williams would retire at the end of that term.  The Republican primary was extremely close, a recount ordered by the Wisconsin Government Accountability Board found Edming the winner by a mere 17 votes over his primary opponent Michael Bub.  Edming went on to win the general election with 66% of the vote.  He was subsequently reelected in 2016, 2018, and 2020.

References

External links
 Representative James Edming at Wisconsin Legislature
 
 
 Edmining Oil Co. at Rusk County, Wisconsin
 OvenWorks Pizza

Living people
People from Rusk County, Wisconsin
Businesspeople from Wisconsin
County supervisors in Wisconsin
Republican Party members of the Wisconsin State Assembly
21st-century American politicians
1945 births